Volver is an album by the Enrico Rava/Dino Saluzzi Quintet recorded in 1986 and released on the ECM label.

Reception
The Allmusic review by Scott Yanow awarded the album 3 stars stating "Rava's introverted yet inwardly passionate playing matches well with Saluzzi's modern tangos, and the results are fairly accessible yet still exploratory. An intriguing set".

Track listing
All compositions by Enrico Rava except as indicated
 "Le But du Souffle" - 6:30 
 "Minguito" (Dino Saluzzi) - 11:21 
 "Luna-Volver" (Carlos Gardel) - 6:34 
 "Tiempos de Ausencias" (Saluzzi) - 8:00 
 "Ballantine for Valentine" (Harry Pepl) - 4:52 
 "Visions" - 10:05 
Recorded at Tonstudio Bauer in Ludwigsburg, West Germany in October 1986

Personnel
Enrico Rava - trumpet
Dino Saluzzi - bandoneón
Harry Pepl - guitar
Furio Di Castri - bass
Bruce Ditmas - drums

References

ECM Records albums
Enrico Rava albums
Dino Saluzzi albums
1987 albums
Albums produced by Manfred Eicher
Collaborative albums